New York Town is a 1941 American romantic comedy film directed by Charles Vidor and starring Fred MacMurray, Mary Martin, Akim Tamiroff, and Robert Preston. The film was written by Lewis Meltzer and an uncredited Preston Sturges based on a story by Jo Swerling.

The film is notable for a long opening "single take" shot which establishes the personalities of several New York City apartment residents.

Plot
Victor Ballard (Fred MacMurray) is a poor but happy-go-lucky New York sidewalk photographer who shares a studio apartment with a painter from Poland, Stefan Janowski (Akim Tamiroff).  When Victor shoots a photo of Alexandra Curtis (Mary Martin), he realizes she is desperate and in need of a friend who can guide her through the ways and means of surviving in Manhattan with no money.  Alexandra moves in as a third roommate and helps out with Victor's street photography. Victor attempts to help her by getting her hooked up with a rich Park Avenue swell, but Alexandra accidentally meets his handsome son, Paul Bryson Jr. (Robert Preston) instead, and Victor, to his own surprise, becomes jealous.  Before Victor and Alexandra come together as a couple, there are (of course) further misunderstandings and fisticuffs and the like.

Cast
 Fred MacMurray as Victor Ballard
 Mary Martin as Alexandra Curtis
 Akim Tamiroff as Stefan Janowski
 Robert Preston as Paul Bryson, Jr.
 Lynne Overman as Sam
 Eric Blore as Vivian
 Fuzzy Knight as Gus Nelson
 Cecil Kellaway as Shipboard Host
 Edward McNamara as Brody
 Oliver Blake as Bender, the lawyer
 Ken Carpenter as Master of Ceremonies
 Sam McDaniel as Henry
 Iris Adrian as Toots O'Day (uncredited)

Production
New York Town, based on the story, "Night Time" by Jo Swerling, was originally to have been directed by Mitchell Leisen, but when he was assigned to do I Wanted Wings, Charles Vidor was borrowed from Columbia.

The film was in production from early November to late December 1940.  The original ending of the film featured a parade of the German-American Bund, but this was re-shot.  The film was released on 31 October 1941, a full 10 months after the completion of principal photography.

Notes

External links 
 
 
 

1941 films
1941 romantic comedy films
American black-and-white films
Films directed by Charles Vidor
Paramount Pictures films
American romantic comedy films
1940s American films
Films set in New York City